Pulmonata or pulmonates, is an informal group (previously an order, and before that a subclass) of snails and slugs characterized by the ability to breathe air, by virtue of having a pallial lung instead of a gill, or gills. The group includes many land and freshwater families, and several marine families.

The taxon Pulmonata as traditionally defined was found to be polyphyletic in a molecular study per Jörger et al., dating from 2010.

Pulmonata are known from the Carboniferous Period to the present.

Pulmonates have a single atrium and kidney, and a concentrated, symmetrical, nervous system. The mantle cavity is on the right side of the body, and lacks gills, instead being converted into a vascularised lung. Most species have a shell, but no operculum, although the group does also include several shell-less slugs. Pulmonates are hermaphroditic, and some groups possess love darts.

Linnean taxonomy
The taxonomy of this group according to the taxonomy of the Gastropoda (Ponder & Lindberg, 1997) was as follows:

Order Pulmonata Cuvier in Blainville, 1814 - pulmonates
Suborder Systellommatophora Pilsbry, 1948
Superfamily Onchidioidea Rafinesque, 1815
Superfamily Otinoidea H. & A. Adams, 1855
Superfamily Rathouisioidea Sarasin, 1889
Suborder Basommatophora Keferstein in Bronn, 1864 - freshwater pulmonates, pond snails
Superfamily Acroloxoidea Thiele, 1931
Superfamily Amphiboloidea J.E. Gray, 1840
Superfamily Chilinoidea H. & A. Adams, 1855
Superfamily Glacidorboidea Ponder, 1986
Superfamily Lymnaeoidea Rafinesque, 1815
Superfamily Planorboidea Rafinesque, 1815
Superfamily Siphonarioidea J.E. Gray, 1840
Suborder Eupulmonata Haszprunar & Huber, 1990
Infraorder Acteophila Dall, 1885 = formerly Archaeopulmonata
Superfamily Melampoidea Stimpson, 1851
Infraorder Trimusculiformes Minichev & Starobogatov, 1975
Superfamily Trimusculoidea Zilch, 1959

Infraorder Stylommatophora A. Schmidt, 1856 - land snails
Subinfraorder Orthurethra
Superfamily Achatinelloidea Gulick, 1873
Superfamily Cochlicopoidea Pilsbry, 1900
Superfamily Partuloidea Pilsbry, 1900
Superfamily Pupilloidea Turton, 1831
Subinfraorder Sigmurethra
Superfamily Acavoidea Pilsbry, 1895
Superfamily Achatinoidea Swainson, 1840
Superfamily Aillyoidea Baker, 1960
Superfamily Arionoidea J.E. Gray in Turnton, 1840
Superfamily Buliminoidea Clessin, 1879
Superfamily Camaenoidea Pilsbry, 1895
Superfamily Clausilioidea Mörch, 1864
Superfamily Dyakioidea Gude & Woodward, 1921
Superfamily Gastrodontoidea Tryon, 1866
Superfamily Helicoidea Rafinesque, 1815
Superfamily Helixarionoidea Bourguignat, 1877
Superfamily Limacoidea Rafinesque, 1815
Superfamily Oleacinoidea H. & A. Adams, 1855
Superfamily Orthalicoidea Albers-Martens, 1860
Superfamily Plectopylidoidea Moellendorf, 1900
Superfamily Polygyroidea Pilsbry, 1894
Superfamily Punctoidea Morse, 1864
Superfamily Rhytidoidea Pilsbry, 1893
Superfamily Sagdidoidera Pilsbry, 1895
Superfamily Staffordioidea Thiele, 1931
Superfamily Streptaxoidea J.E. Gray, 1806
Superfamily Strophocheiloidea Thiele, 1926
Superfamily Trigonochlamydoidea Hese, 1882
Superfamily Zonitoidea Mörch, 1864
? Superfamily Athoracophoroidea P. Fischer, 1883 = Tracheopulmonata
? Superfamily Succineoidea Beck, 1837 = Heterurethra

2005 taxonomy 
 
The taxonomy of this group according to the taxonomy of the Gastropoda (Bouchet & Rocroi, 2005) was as follows:

Informal Group Pulmonata 
Contains the informal group Basommatophora and the clade Eupulmonata

Informal Group Basommatophora 
Contains the clade Hygrophila 
Superfamily Amphiboloidea
Family Amphibolidae
Superfamily Siphonarioidea
Family Siphonariidae
 † Family Acroreiidae

Clade Hygrophila 
Superfamily Chilinoidea
Family Chilinidae
Family Latiidae
Superfamily Acroloxoidea
Family Acroloxidae
Superfamily Lymnaeoidea
Family Lymnaeidae
Superfamily Planorboidea
Family Planorbidae
Family Physidae

Clade Eupulmonata 
Contains the clades Systellommatophora and Stylommatophora
Superfamily Trimusculoidea
Family Trimusculidae
Superfamily Otinoidea
Family Otinidae
Family Smeagolidae
Superfamily Ellobioidea
Family Ellobiidae

Clade Systellommatophora ( = Gymnomorpha) 
Superfamily Onchidioidea
Family Onchidiidae
Superfamily Veronicelloidea
Family Veronicellidae
Family Rathouisiidae

Clade Stylommatophora 
Contains the subclades Elasmognatha, Orthurethra and the informal group Sigmurethra

Subclade Elasmognatha 
Superfamily Succineoidea
Family Succineidae
Superfamily Athoracophoroidea
Family Athoracophoridae

Subclade Orthurethra 
Superfamily Partuloidea
Family Partulidae
Family Draparnaudiidae
Superfamily Achatinelloidea
Family Achatinellidae
Superfamily Cochlicopoidea
Family Cochlicopidae
Family Amastridae
Superfamily Pupilloidea
Family Pupillidae
Family Argnidae
Family Chondrinidae
 † Family Cylindrellinidae
Family Lauriidae
Family Orculidae
Family Pleurodiscidae
Family Pyramidulidae
Family Spelaeodiscidae
Family Strobilopsidae
Family Valloniidae
Family Vertiginidae
Superfamily Enoidea
Family Enidae
Family Cerastidae

Informal Group Sigmurethra 
Superfamily Clausilioidea
Family Clausiliidae
 † Family Anadromidae
 † Family Filholiidae
 † Family Palaeostoidae
Superfamily Orthalicoidea
Family Orthalicidae
Family Cerionidae
Family Coelociontidae
 † Family Grangerellidae
Family Megaspiridae
Family Placostylidae
Family Urocoptidae
Superfamily Achatinoidea
Family Achatinidae
Family Ferussaciidae
Family Micractaeonidae
Family Subulinidae
Superfamily Aillyoidea
Family Aillyidae
Superfamily Testacelloidea
Family Testacellidae
Family Oleacinidae
Family Spiraxidae
Superfamily Papillodermatoidea
Family Papillodermatidae
Superfamily Streptaxoidea
Family Streptaxidae
Superfamily  Rhytidoidea
Family Rhytididae
Family Chlamydephoridae
Family Haplotrematidae
Family Scolodontidae
Superfamily Acavoidea
Family Acavidae
Family Caryodidae
Family Dorcasiidae
Family Macrocyclidae
Family Megomphicidae
Family Strophocheilidae
Superfamily Punctoidea
Family Punctidae
 † Family Anastomopsidae
Family Charopidae
Family Cystopeltidae
Family Discidae
Family Endodontidae
Family Helicodiscidae
Family Oreohelicidae
Family Thyrophorellidae
Superfamily Sagdoidea
Family Sagdidae

limacoid clade 
Superfamily Staffordioidea
Family Staffordiidae
Superfamily Dyakioidea
Family Dyakiidae
Superfamily Gastrodontoidea
Family Gastrodontidae
Family Chronidae
Family Euconulidae
Family Oxychilidae
Family Pristilomatidae
Family Trochomorphidae
Fossil taxa probably belonging to the Gastrodontoidea
Subfamily † Archaeozonitinae
Subfamily † Grandipatulinae
Subfamily † Palaeoxestininae
Superfamily Parmacelloidea
Family Parmacellidae
Family Milacidae
Family Trigonochlamydidae
Superfamily Zonitoidea
Family Zonitidae
Superfamily Helicarionoidea
Family Helicarionidae
Family Ariophantidae
Family Urocyclidae
Superfamily Limacoidea
Family Limacidae
Family Agriolimacidae
Family Boettgerillidae
Family Vitrinidae

other Sigmurethra 
Two superfamilies belongs to clade Sigmurethra, but they are not in the limacoid clade.
Superfamily Arionoidea
Family Arionidae
Family Anadenidae
Family Ariolimacidae
Family Binneyidae
Family Oopeltidae
Family Philomycidae
Superfamily Helicoidea
Family Helicidae
Family Bradybaenidae
Family Camaenidae
Family Cepolidae
Family Cochlicellidae
Family Elonidae
Family Epiphragmophoridae
Family Halolimnohelicidae
Family Helicodontidae
Family Helminthoglyptidae
Family Humboldtianidae
Family Hygromiidae
Family Monadeniidae
Family Pleurodontidae
Family Polygyridae
Family Sphincterochilidae
Family Thysanophoridae
Family Trissexodontidae
Family Xanthonychidae

2010 taxonomy
Jörger et al. (2010) analyzed major groups within the Heterobranchia using genetic data and found that Pulmonata as traditionally defined was polyphyletic, for instance some pulmonates were more closely related to Sacoglossa and Acochlidia. They proposed the more inclusive taxon Panpulmonata to unite the clades Siphonarioidea, Sacoglossa, Glacidorboidea, Pyramidelloidea, Amphiboloidea, Hygrophila, Acochlidia and Eupulmonata.

References

Further reading

External links 

 Pulmonate snails & slugs in captivity

Obsolete gastropod taxa
Carboniferous first appearances
Taxa named by Georges Cuvier